Paha is a genus of cylindrical bark beetles in the family Zopheridae. There are at least two described species in Paha.

Species
These two species belong to the genus Paha:
 Paha guadalupensis Dajoz, 1984
 Paha laticollis (LeConte, 1863)

References

Further reading

 
 
 
 

Zopheridae